Marieke Lettink is a New Zealand herpetologist.

Biography 
Lettink holds a PhD in Zoology, a Master's in Science and a postgraduate diploma in wildlife management.

She is a member of the Department of Conservation's Lizard Technical Advisory Group, a council member of the Society for Research of Amphibians and Reptiles of New Zealand (SRARNZ), and the Canterbury representative to the New Zealand Herpetological Society.

Publications 

 Lettink, M. & Whitaker, A. H. (2004). Lizards of Banks Peninsula. Christchurch [N.Z.] Dept. of Conservation
Lettink, M. (2005). Attracting lizards to your garden: Options for Canterbury. Christchurch [N.Z}.: Dept. of Conservation

References

Living people
New Zealand herpetologists
Year of birth missing (living people)
Women herpetologists
21st-century New Zealand women scientists
21st-century zoologists